Vichitra Prema is a 1991 Telugu-language comedy film, produced by A. Suryanarayana under the Sri Lakshmi Narayana Enterprises banner and directed by Jandhyala. It stars Rajendra Prasad and Amurtha, with music composed by K. V. Mahadevan.

Plot
The film begins on, two soulmates Seetapathi (Subbaraya Sarma) & Major Pratapa Rao (Abhishith Varma) fixing up their children, Sivudu (Rajendra Prasad) & Parvati's (Amurtha) alliance in their childhood. But unfortunately, the children grows up with rivalry, so, the elders separate them. After 10 years, they meet unknowingly and an incident makes Parvati misunderstand Sivudu as a thief. Eventually, the elders arrange their get-together, when a clash arises between them which turns into hatred. So, the elders decide to perform their marriage immediately and forcibly start the arrangements. To escape, Sivudu & Parvathi take the help of their friend Babji (Brahmanandam) who gives an idea to separate their parents. After that, they play a drama along with a few drama artists, Venkatrao (Suthi Velu) & Kalpana (Jayalalitha) and successfully turns their parents' friendship into enmity. Thereafter, many truths come forward which makes Parvathi realize the virtue of Sivudu. Meanwhile, Parvathi goes into the trap of a cheater Avinash (Navabharat Balaji) when Sivudu rescues her. Here they truly fall in love when both the elders burst out and forcibly arrange the children's marriages with unknown people. At last, Sivudu brings out the truth and reunites the elders. Finally, the movie ends on a happy note with the marriage of Sivudu & Parvati.

Cast
Rajendra Prasad as Sivudu
Amurtha as Parvathi
Brahmanandam as Babji
Dharmavarapu Subramanyam as Murthy
Suthi Velu as Gaali Venkatarao
Gundu Hanumantha Rao as Aarmughan
Subbaraya Sharma as Seetapathi
Abhishith Varma as Major Pratapa Varma
Navabharat Balaji as Avinash
Jenny as Taxi driver 
Sri Lakshmi as Krishnaveni / Krishti 
Jayalalita as Kalpana
Nagamani as Lakshmi
K. Vijayalakshmi as Saraswathi

Soundtrack

Music composed by K. V. Mahadevan. Lyrics were written by Veturi. Music released on AVM Audio Company.

References

External links

1991 films
1990s Telugu-language films
Indian comedy films
Films directed by Jandhyala
Films scored by K. V. Mahadevan
1991 comedy films